Arroyo Viejo is a westward flowing  creek that begins in the Oakland Hills in Alameda County, California, and joins Lion Creek just before entering San Leandro Bay, a part of eastern San Francisco Bay.

History
Arroyo Viejo means Old Creek in Spanish.

Hiking
There is a hiking trail offering visibility into the eastern San Leandro Bay marshlands between East Creek and Damon Marsh at the mouth of Lion Creek.

Watershed and course
The Arroyo Viejo Creek Watershed drains  beginning on the western slope of the Oakland hills and running west through the northern boundary of Knowland Park then urban Oakland before merging with Lion Creek and entering San Leandro Bay, and finally, San Francisco Bay. Rifle Range Creek begins in the Leona Canyon Regional Open Space park, then joins the Arroyo Melrose Highlands Branch, which is also joined by Country Club Creek (which flows along the northern boundary of Sequoyah Country Club). The Arroyo Melrose Highlands Branch joins Arroyo Viejo at the MacArthur Freeway. Below the freeway, the creek is joined by the 73rd Avenue Branch (which is in an underground pipe), and continues in a series of engineered channels and underground culverts to Lion Creek (also known as Arroyo de Leona) and crosses Interstate 880 to San Leandro Bay within the larger San Francisco Bay.

Ecology
The upper tributaries of Arroyo Viejo lie in what was historically a belt of coast redwood (Sequoia sempervirens) extending from the Leona Canyon Regional Open Space Preserve up to Redwood Regional Park and east to Moraga.

See also
Rivers of California

References

External links
 Arroyo Viejo at Oakland Museum Watershed Maps
 Arroyo Viejo Recreation Center page

Geography of Oakland, California
Rivers of Alameda County, California
Rivers of Northern California